is a New Zealand rugby union player who plays as a fly-half. He currently plays for Hino Red Dolphins in Japan's domestic Top League. He represented the Sunwolves in the 2017 Super Rugby season.

References

1990 births
Living people
New Zealand rugby union players
Rugby union fly-halves
Sunwolves players
Hino Red Dolphins players
Wellington rugby union players
Tasman rugby union players
Urayasu D-Rocks players